A-lan-nah is the third studio album by Canadian singer Alannah Myles. It was in released in 1995 on Atlantic Records. Miles Copeland was credited as the executive producer.

Track listing

Personnel 
 Alannah Myles – vocals
 Phil Parlapiano – acoustic piano (1, 4), Wurlitzer electric piano (1, 6), organ (1, 2, 3, 5, 6, 7, 10), accordion (2, 4, 5, 7, 9-12), mandolin (2), Rhodes piano (3), Mellotron (4, 8, 11), keyboards (5), acoustic guitar (8), pump organ (12)
 Kurt Schefter – electric guitars (1-7, 11), backing vocals (1, 2, 9), acoustic guitar (2, 4, 7-10), slide guitar (2)
 David Wipper – acoustic guitar (1, 2, 3, 5-9, 11), mandolin (4, 8, 9), banjo (9)
 Armand Sabal-Lecco – bass (1-9, 11)
 Jørn Andersen – drums, backing vocals (1, 2, 9), spoons (4)
 Ray Caldwell – bodhrán (5), tin whistle (5), low whistle (12), Uilleann pipes (12)
 Hugh Marsh – violin (4, 5, 8)
 George Koller – cello (8, 10)
 Jackie Richardson – backing vocals (1, 6, 7)
 Vivienne Williams – backing vocals (1, 7)

Production 
 Miles Copeland III – executive producer 
 Pat Moran – producer, engineer, mixing 
 Ed Krautner – engineer
 Peter Lee – engineer 
 Brad Nelson – engineer 
 L. Stu Young – engineer 
 Paul Offenbacher – engineer 
 Luis Quine – assistant engineer 
 Andora Studios (Los Angeles, California) – mixing location 
 Kit Mitchell – studio manager 
 Stephen Marcussen – mastering at Precision Mastering (Hollywood, California)
 Peter Stoynich – production coordinator 
 Thomas Bricker – art direction
 Amanda Kavanagh – design 
 Deborah Samuel – photography 
 Helen Chudoba – hair stylist
 Chris Martin – stylist
 Lisa Panagapka – wardrobe 
 Rena Andreoli – make-up
 Feary Bina – color
 Olivia – jewelry 
 Firstars, Inc. – management

References

1995 albums
Alannah Myles albums
Albums produced by Pat Moran
Albums recorded at Metalworks Studios
Atlantic Records albums